Alan Willey (born 18 October 1956) is an English former footballer who spent most of his playing career in the United States. He is a member of the National Soccer Hall of Fame.

Born in Houghton-le-Spring, Willey is the second-leading goal scorer in the history of the North American Soccer League (NASL). Willey played most of his career with the Minnesota Kicks and was inducted to the U.S. National Soccer Hall of Fame in 2003.

He began his career with English football club, Middlesbrough in 1974. In the NASL he played for the Minnesota Kicks (1976 to 1981), the Montreal Manic (1981 to 1983) and the Minnesota Strikers (1984).

He finished his NASL career with 129 goals in 238 games and an additional 13 goals in 26 play-off games. He memorably scored five goals in a play-off game against the New York Cosmos in 1978. His nickname was 'The Artful Dodger'.

References

External links
NASL/MISL stats

1956 births
Living people
English footballers
English expatriate footballers
Expatriate soccer players in Canada
Expatriate soccer players in the United States
Major Indoor Soccer League (1978–1992) players
Middlesbrough F.C. players
Minnesota Kicks players
Minnesota Strikers (NASL) players
Montreal Manic players
North American Soccer League (1968–1984) indoor players
North American Soccer League (1968–1984) players
National Soccer Hall of Fame members
San Diego Sockers (original MISL) players
Association football forwards
Minnesota Strikers (MISL) players
English expatriate sportspeople in the United States
English expatriate sportspeople in Canada